Telašćica  is a bay in the southeastern part of the island of Dugi Otok, Croatia, in the Adriatic Sea. It is a designated nature park, full of wildlife and sea creatures.

Geography

Telašćica is a 10 km long, 160–1800 m wide, deep inlet dotted with cliffs, islets and bays. The cliffs of Dugi Otok, called the stene locally, rise to 161 m above sea level and drop down to a depth of 90 m. Telašćica bay, which actually consists of three smaller bays, is a good, safe harbour for all kinds of vessels. The northeastern side of the bay is completely bare, but the southwestern shore is covered in thick forest of pine, olive and fig trees. There are six islets and rocks in the Bay: Korotan, Galijola, Gozdenjak, Farfarikulac, Gornji Školj and Donji Školj. Lake Mir is a saltwater lake on a narrow strip of land between Telašćica Bay and the open sea. The lake is salty due to underground connections to the sea.

See also
 Protected areas of Croatia
 Tentative list of World Heritage Sites in Croatia

References

External links
 Telašćica Park website

Nature parks of Croatia
Landforms of Zadar County
Dugi Otok
Protected areas of Zadar County